Curdsville is an unincorporated community in Buckingham County, in the U.S. state of Virginia.

An 1855 gazetteer described it as "a small post-village" at the head of navigation on the Willis River with "a large flouring mill."

References

Unincorporated communities in Virginia
Unincorporated communities in Buckingham County, Virginia